Reed Ridge is a flat-topped, snow-covered ridge extending northwest for 3 nautical miles (6 km) from the west part of the Ford Massif, Thiel Mountains. The ridge forms the west wall of Compton Valley. Mapped by United States Geological Survey (USGS) from surveys and U.S. Navy air photos, 1959–61. Named by Advisory Committee on Antarctic Names (US-ACAN) for Dale R. Reed, ionospheric scientist at Ellsworth Station in 1958 and Byrd Station in 1960.

See also
Streitenberger Cliff

References

Ridges of Ellsworth Land